Radka is female given name. Diminutive of Slavic names beginning with rad care, joy. Feminine version of Radek. Similar names are Radana, Radimíra, Raduše, Radmila, Radomira, Radoslava. Pronounced RAHD-kah.

Other variants 
Slovak: Radka
Bulgarian: Radka, Rayna or Rayka
Russian: Rada
German: Radka
Croatian: Rada, Radojica or Radika
Serbian: Rada or Radoyica

Name Days 
Czech: 14 September
Bulgarian: 8 November

Famous bearers 
Radka Bártová, Slovak figure skater
Radka Brožková, Czech orienteering competitor, bronze medallist from the world
Radka Fišarová, Czech jazz singer
Radka Jossifova, First "Miss Bulgaria", 1929, Audience choice
Radka Kovaříková, Czech pair skater
Radka Toneff, Norwegian jazz singer
Radka Zrubáková, Slovak retired professional tennis player
Radka Kocurová, Czech model and moderator
Radka Coufalová, Czech actress
Radka Nováková, Czech model
Radka Skácelová, Czech writer
Radka Stupková, Czech actress and voice artist
Radka Pavlovčinová, Slovak actress
Radka Pilná, Czech moderator
Radka Kadlecová, Czech producer
Radka Buchtová, Czech model

External links 
Radka -> Behind the Name

References 
Miloslava Knappová

Czech feminine given names